George Nield Gillett Jr. (born October 22, 1938) is an American businessman. Originally from Wisconsin, he lives in Vail, Colorado.

Biography
Gillett graduated from Lake Forest Academy in 1956. He attended Amherst College and is a 1961 graduate of Dominican College of Racine, Wisconsin. Gillett's first job following college was with Crown Zellerbach as regional sales manager. 
     
Gillett's career continued in the 1960s in marketing and management consulting, initially with McKinsey & Co. A sports fanatic since childhood, by 1966, he was business manager and partner of the Miami Dolphins. In 1966, he purchased a 20% interest in the Miami Dolphins NFL franchise for $1 million. He sold this interest in 1968 for $3 million, and used some of the proceeds to purchase the nearly defunct Harlem Globetrotters and later started Globetrotters Communications, a nationally syndicated radio group. He reinvigorated the Globetrotters by an intense marketing effort that included a popular cartoon series.
 
In 1978, Gillett bought Packerland Packing Co. With the successful venture of Packerland, Gillett then diversified into radio and television with the start of Gillett Communications Company. At its peak, Gillett Communications owned network affiliates, the majority of which were CBS, in many of the country's major television markets.

In 1979, he launched Gillett Communications by buying three small television stations. Three years later he bought the WSM television station in Nashville. In 1984, Gillett acquired Appleton-based Post Corporation's eight television stations, 22 newspapers and associated plants; the non-broadcast assets were sold to Thomson Corporation and other buyers. In 1986, he bought out the two A.S. Abell stations as part of a spin-off resulting from the acquisition of A.S. Abell by Times Mirror Company. In 1987, he acquired Storer Broadcasting using Kohlberg Kravis Roberts junk bonds, after the Federal Communications Commission (FCC) lifted restrictions on ownership. The Gillett stations were subsequently spun off to Busse Broadcasting, a company formed by Gillett employees.

In 1985, Gillett acquired Vail Associates' Vail and Beaver Creek ski resorts. He would often ride chairlifts and greet guests, and launched a massive installation of high-speed detachable chairlifts. Gillett also supported major alpine ski events at a time when most ski areas in America declined to host international races, starting with the 1989 World Alpine Ski Championships, and through his support hosted the 1999 World Alpine Ski Championships.

Gillett's companies sought Chapter 11 protection in 1992, as higher interest rates penalised junk bond issuers. Gillett's media arm was reorganized as SCI Television, shortly before being purchased by New World Communications under the control of Ronald Perelman. Many of these stations would eventually be sold to News Corporation and become owned-and-operated stations carrying Fox.

After junk bonds
Gillett walked away with $32.1 million to restart his business empire when Vail floated on the NYSE. In 1995, he repurchased Packerland undertaken by Booth Creek Management Corp., a company created to oversee the acquisitions and management of interests of the Gillett family from that point forwards, and of which Gillett remains chairman.

In 1996, he formed Booth Creek Ski Holdings Inc., acquiring or building a range of ski resorts in New Hampshire, California, Washington and Wyoming. He later bought Grand Targhee Ski and Summer Resort, together with several golf courses. Booth Creek continues to operate Sierra-at-Tahoe.

From 1997, he extended his meat interests by building Corporate Brand Foods America (which included ITC, Iowa Ham, Jordan Meats and Wright Bacon). Iowa Beef Processors (IBP) purchased the company for US$550 million in 1999.

Gillett and Hicks, Muse, Tate & Furst then bought ConAgra's beef operations – Swift & Company – for US$1.4 billion in 2000. On July 12, 2007, JBS S.A., the largest beef processor in South America and one of the largest worldwide beef exporters, purchased Swift & Company in a US$1.5 billion all-cash deal. The acquisition made the newly consolidated JBS Swift Group the largest beef processor in the world.

In the meat business, Gillett now also formally controlled:
Petaluma Poultry – natural and organic chicken products
Snowball Foods – food processor of turkey and chicken products
Kings Delight – food processor of turkey and chicken products
B3R Country Meats – processes fresh and frozen natural beef
Coleman Natural Products – processes fresh and frozen natural pork products and lamb
Gerhard's Napa Valley Sausage – a producer of gourmet sausage products made primarily from poultry.

North American sports interests
In 2000, Gillett joined forces with Pat Bowlen and John Elway in a failed attempt to buy the Denver Nuggets of the NBA, Colorado Avalanche of the NHL, and Pepsi Center. On January 2, 2001, Gillett bought an 80% interest in the Montreal Canadiens and their home arena, Molson Centre, for US$185 million. Prior to the purchase, Gillett had shown interest in the Florida Panthers, New York Islanders, Ottawa Senators, and the Phoenix Coyotes. Gillett's bid initially raised fears that he might move the NHL's oldest franchise to the United States. However, after no other viable offers surfaced from Canadian interests, Molson agreed to Gillett's offer. Molson, however, maintained the right of first refusal should Gillett ever sell the team.

On August 6, 2007, Gillett bought a controlling interest of the NASCAR team Evernham Motorsports from founder Ray Evernham, thereby forming Gillett Evernham Motorsports. In January 2009, a merger was completed with fellow NASCAR team Petty Enterprises. As a result, GEM was renamed Richard Petty Motorsports. Gillett sold his share in the team after the 2010 season.

On March 27, 2008, Joey Saputo, chairman of USL First Division team Montreal Impact, confirmed talks with Gillett and Major League Soccer for a Montreal franchise. While a bid for a franchise was launched with Saputo and Gillett co-heading the venture, as a result of finances, however, the team would rescind the bid later that year on November 22.

On June 20, 2009, the Montreal Canadiens confirmed that Gillett had sold the team, along with the Bell Centre and the Gillett Entertainment Group, a Canadian-based sports and entertainment promoter, to the Molson brothers for a reported $550 million (Cdn). The deal was concluded on December 1, 2009.

Liverpool F.C.

Since October 2006, Gillett and fellow American Tom Hicks had been parties interested in a proposed takeover of Liverpool F.C. of the Premier League. In January 2007, Reports stated that Gillett had made another bid for Liverpool. On January 31, 2007, Dubai International Capital announced they had pulled out of the deal, giving Gillett the opportunity to buy the club from David Moores. On February 2, 2007, Gillett and Hicks reached a deal with the club's board, which was sealed on February 6, thought to be worth in the region of £435 million: £220 million to buy out existing shareholders (including approximately £44.8 million of debt), and £215 million for the new stadium proposed at nearby Stanley Park. The Board unanimously recommended that the club's shareholders accept this offer.

On January 22, 2008, a majority of Liverpool fans, at the game between Liverpool and Aston Villa, protested against Gillett and Hicks' running of the club, urging the pair to sell their shares in Liverpool F.C. to Dubai International Capital (DIC). Neither owner, nor their representative Foster Gillett were present at the game. Gillett was reportedly targeted by DIC to sell his shares. It was reported that he has fallen out with Tom Hicks and in recent months has kept silent over his dealing with the club. On March 7, 2008, it was reported that Gillett had agreed to sell 98 per cent of his Liverpool stock to DIC, but Hicks blocked the sale. In an interview on Prime Time Sports in Canada, Gillett revealed that he and his family had received death threats from angry Liverpool fans: "The fans don’t want him [Tom Hicks] to have even one share of my stake in the club, based on what they are sending to me. As a result of that we [my family] have received many phone calls in the middle of the night threatening our lives, death threats. A number came to the office and my son, Foster, and daughter-in-law, Lauren, have received them." The relationship between Gillett and Hicks broke down some time ago, leading to in-fighting at Anfield.

It has been reported that former manager Rafael Benítez's relationship with Hicks and Gillett had become increasingly strained and he was fired on June 2, 2010, after a poor season which saw the club finish seventh in the Premier League, missing out on UEFA Champions League football for the following season.

As of October 15, 2010, Gillett had lost ownership of Liverpool F.C., and despite numerous attempts to prevent it, the club was sold to New England Sports Ventures (NESV), for a fee believed to be around £300M which was far below his valuation of "between £600M and £1 billion (B)", by the Liverpool F.C. board of directors in a 3–2 vote.

As of November 2010, Gillett was personally named in a lawsuit filed by Mill Financial, seeking $117 million. Mill Financial, based in Springfield, Virginia, reportedly refinanced a loan used by Gillett to buy a big stake in Liverpool F.C. in 2007. Gillett's partner in the deal was Tom Hicks. Gillett and Hicks, dba Gillett Football LLC, lost control of Liverpool F.C. after they were unable to stop the Royal Bank of Scotland, which financed their original purchase of the team, from selling Liverpool F.C. The bank sold Liverpool F.C. to Boston Red Sox owner John W. Henry’s New England Sports Ventures at a price that was lower than expected. At the same time the Liverpool issue was occurring, Gillett's Richard Petty Motorsports fell into financial trouble.

On January 11, 2013, Hicks and Gillett finally decided to drop their case in the English law courts against Sir Martin Broughton, Christian Purslow and Ian Ayre, the three directors on the board of Liverpool F.C. at the time of the sale of the club to NESV. They also agreed to drop their case against NESV and RBS Bank. The terms of the agreement are confidential, though it is believed that no monies were paid to Hicks or Gillett. Earlier in the week, Hicks and Gillett had lost a Court of Appeal bid to delay a High Court trial, so they could have more time to raise the monies needed to fund the multimillion-pound lawsuit.

As of 2016, Gillett is still paying £1.5 million per year in interest payments to Mill Financial, who lent him £50 million for his failed investment in Liverpool.

Other interests
Other former Gillett business interests include:
Northland Services Inc. – a marine transportation company
Great Northern Bark and Sierra Organics – landscaping and gardening products company

Gillett's other current business interests include:
Summit Automotive Partners, an auto dealership group

References

External links
Montreal Canadiens Hockey Club – team owner
Liverpool Football Club – proposed new stadium
Gillett sued by Mill Financial

1938 births
American billionaires
American soccer chairmen and investors
Amherst College alumni
Dominican College of Racine alumni
Liverpool F.C. chairmen and investors
Living people
NASCAR team owners
National Hockey League executives
National Hockey League owners
Businesspeople from Racine, Wisconsin
Lake Forest Academy alumni
American sports businesspeople
McKinsey & Company people